Gamla Upsala SK is a Swedish football club located in Uppsala.

Background
Since their foundation on 24 April 1947 Gamla Upsala SK has participated mainly in the middle and lower divisions of the Swedish football league system.  The club currently plays in Division 2 Norra Svealand which is the fourth tier of Swedish football. They play their home matches at the Lötens IP in Uppsala.

The club developed strong roots with Gamla Upsala (Old Upsala) in its early years and afterwards with the northeastern part of the municipality of Uppsala.
Football has been the dominant sport for GUSK but the club has also specialised in table tennis, cross-country skiing, bandy and floorball.

Gamla Upsala SK are affiliated to the Upplands Fotbollförbund.

Season to season

External links
  – Official Website

Footnotes

Football clubs in Uppsala County
Association football clubs established in 1947
Bandy clubs established in 1947
1947 establishments in Sweden
Sport in Uppsala